Félix Pruvot (born 6 April 1980) is a French sailor. He competed in the Laser event at the 2004 Summer Olympics.

References

External links
 

1980 births
Living people
French male sailors (sport)
Olympic sailors of France
Sailors at the 2004 Summer Olympics – Laser
Sportspeople from Abidjan